Mo' Wax was a British record label founded by James Lavelle in 1992. The label was not co-founded by Tim Goldsworthy, as is often reported. Steve Finan became co-owner shortly after. 

Mo' Wax came to recognition for being at the forefront of trip hop, turntablism and alternative hip hop during the mid-1990s. The label is also responsible for bringing attention to the graffiti artist Futura 2000 by using his artwork on many of its releases in the early to mid-1990s. 

Lavelle signed partial ownership of Mo' Wax over to A&M Records (now part of the Universal Music Group) in 1996. When their deal expired he signed with Beggars Group, who still own some of the catalogue.

The name derives from "Mo' Wax Please", the title of a column James Lavelle wrote in the magazine Straight No Chaser and the Oxford club night he ran. This in turn was influenced by the Freddie Roach LP, Mo' Greens Please on Blue Note records.

The original Mo' Wax logo as used on the early releases was designed by UK graphic designer Ian Swift "Swifty", but the label grew their reputation by featuring artwork contributions from Futura, Robert Del Naja (from Massive Attack), She One and Req 1. Ben Drury was the main designer responsible for the art direction and design of the label.

The label also released toys and art prints under their Mo' Wax Arts (MWA) imprint, and collaborated with artists such as Mark Gonzales, Mike Mills, and Money Mark.

The label shut in 2002 and was celebrated in 2014 with an exhibition titled "Urban Archaeology: 21 years of Mo' Wax".

In 2015, Lavelle licensed back the Mo'Wax label to release Elliott Power's "Murmur" single as a limited edition hand stamped 12" vinyl. On 26 February 2016, Elliott Power's debut album, Once Smitten, was released on Mo'Wax in collaboration with Marathon Artists. This is the labels most recent release.

Discography

 MW 001 V.A. – Jazz Hip Jap Project
 MW 002 The Federation – Flower To The Sun
 MW 003 V.A. – Royaltie$ Overdue
 MW 004 Marden Hill – Come On (12")
 MW 005 RPM – Food Of My De-Rhythm (12")
 MW 006 The Federation – Life So Free (12")
 MW 007 Mistura – Coast to Coast (12")
 MW 008 Bubbatunes – This Is Just A Dance (12")
 MW 009 Palm Skin Productions – Time & Space EP (12")
 MW 010 V.A. – Jazz Hip Jap Project
 MW 015 The Federation – Remix E.P. (12")
 MW 018 RPM – 2000 / Sortie Des Ombres
 MW 025 DJ Krush – Strictly Turntablized
 MW 026 V.A. -Headz
 MW 034 Money Mark – Mark's Keyboard Repair
 MW 037 Rob Dougan – Clubbed to Death
 MW 039 DJ Krush – Meiso
 MW 046 Dr Octagon – Dr. Octagonecologyst
 MW 059 DJ Shadow – Endtroducing.....
 MW 061 V.A. – Headz 2A
 MW 062 V.A. – Headz 2B
 MW 064 Dr Octagon – Instrumentalyst (Octagon Beats)
 MW 072 Luke Vibert – Big Soup
 MW 073 Sukia – Contacto Espacial Con El Tercer Sexo
 MW 077 DJ Krush – MiLight
 MW 078 Liquid Liquid – Liquid Liquid
 MW 080 Attica Blues – Attica Blues
 MW 082 V.A. – The Original Artform
 MW 085 UNKLE – Psyence Fiction
 MW 088 DJ Krush – Holonic-The Self Megamix
 MW 090 Money Mark – Push The Button
 MW 099 Andrea Parker – Kiss My Arp
 MW 101 V.A. – Time Machine (mixed by Psychonauts)
 MW 102 Urban Tribe – The Collapse Of Modern Culture
 MW 104 Tommy Guerrero – A Little Bit Of Somethin'''
 MW 105 Major Force West – 93–97 MW 110 V.A. – Quannum Spectrum MW 112 Blackalicious – Nia MW 115 DJ Assault – Belle Isle Tech MW 121 DJ Magic Mike – The Journey (Era Of Bass Part 1) MW 122 Divine Styler – Wordpower, Vol. 2: Directrix MW 129 Nigo – Ape Sounds MW 132 South – From Here On In MW 141 David Axelrod – David Axelrod MW 143 Malcom Catto – Popcorn Bubble Fish MW 145 V.A. – Now Thing   MW 152 Malcom Catto – Bubblefish Breaks      MW 155 Jordan Fields- Moments In Dub    MW 158 Tommy Guerrero – Soul Food Taqueria MW 159 Parsley Sound – Parsley Sounds     MWU 001 UNKLE – Never, Never, Land MW 001 Repercussions – Promise MW 01 Blackalicious – Melodica''

References

External links
 Mo' Wax Discography
 Mo'Wax at Discogs.com
 Mo' Wax Please
 Review & Discography at Djouls.com

British record labels
Electronic music record labels
Hip hop record labels